Augustus Williams (1842 – unknown) was a seaman in the U.S. Navy stationed aboard the  during the American Civil War. He received the Medal of Honor for his actions during the Second Battle of Fort Fisher on January 15, 1865.

Military service
Emigrating from his native Norway, Williams volunteered for service in the U.S. Navy and was assigned to the Union brig . His enlistment is credited to the state of Massachusetts.

On January 15, 1865, the North Carolina Confederate stronghold of Fort Fisher was taken by a combined Union storming party of sailors, marines, and soldiers under the command of Admiral David Dixon Porter and General Alfred Terry.

Medal of Honor citation
The President of the United States of America, in the name of Congress, takes pleasure in presenting the Medal of Honor to Seaman Augustus Williams, United States Navy, for extraordinary heroism in action while serving on board the U.S.S. Santiago de Cuba during the assault by the fleet on Fort Fisher, North Carolina on 15 January 1865. When the landing party to which he was attached charged on the fort with a cheer, and with determination to plant their colors on the ramparts, Seaman Williams remained steadfast when they reached the foot of the fort and more than two-thirds of the marines and sailors fell back in panic. Taking cover when the enemy concentrated his fire on the remainder of the group, he alone remained with his executive officer, subsequently withdrawing from the field after darkness.
General Orders: War Department, General Orders No. 59 (June 22, 1865)

Action Date: January 15, 1865

Service: Navy

Rank: Seaman

Division: U.S.S. Santiago de Cuba

See also

List of Medal of Honor recipients
List of American Civil War Medal of Honor recipients: T–Z

References

1842 births
Year of death missing
People from Kristiansand
United States Navy Medal of Honor recipients
Norwegian-born Medal of Honor recipients
Union Navy sailors
Norwegian emigrants to the United States
American Civil War recipients of the Medal of Honor